Shustovo is a rural locality (a village) in Ustyuzhenskoye Rural Settlement, Ustyuzhensky District, Vologda Oblast, Russia. The population was 6 as of 2002.

Geography 
Kormovesovo is the nearest rural locality.

References 

Rural localities in Ustyuzhensky District